Frederik Hoppe (18 September  1770 – 22 February 1837) was a Danish landowner, chamberlain and Member of the Royal Hunt. He owned the Bernstorff Mansion in Copenhagen as well as the estates Løvegård and Søbygård at Kalundborg.

Early life and education
Hoppe was born on 18 September 1770 in Copenhagen, the third of four children of Supreme Court justice Peder Hoppe (1727–1778) and Elisabeth Hoppe née Holst (1740–1773). An elder brother by the same name had died before he was born.  His mother died when he was just three years old. His father was ennobled in 1777. After his death the following year, Hoppe was brought up in the house of professor Børge Riisbrigh. He enrolled at the University of Copenhagen in 1787.

On reaching the Age of majority, he received an inheritance of 20,000 species daler from his father and 80,000 species daler from his uncle Abraham Pelt. On 5 February 1791, he graduated with a degree in law from the university. In 1792, he travelled to Göttingen with the mineralogist G. Wad to continue his studies. On 11 February 1795, he was engaged as a student teacher. His younger brother, Johan Christopher Hoppe, a naval officer, reached the rank of counter admiral.

Property
In 1800, Hoppe purchased Bernstorff Mansion on Bredgade. In 1806, he then purchased the estates Frihedslund, Søbygaard and Løvegaard at Kalundborg. In 1809, he sold Frihedslund. In 1810, he also parted with Løvegaard. Søbygaard remained in his ownership until 1829.

On 28 January 1811, he was appointed chamberlain.  On 30 January 1817, he became a member of the Royal Hunt.

Personal life

They had six children, of which the four sons died without leaving offspring. The younger daughter, Eleonora Sophie Frederikke Hoppe (1807–1866 in Vedbæk), was married to Georg Bernadotte Sehested (1808–1873), a forester.

Hoppe died on 22 February 1837 in Copenhagen. He is buried in Holmen Cemetery.

References

Rxternal links

 Frederik Hoppe

19th-century Danish landowners
Danish jurists
Danish nobility
People from Copenhagen
University of Copenhagen alumni
Burials at Holmen Cemetery
1770 births
1837 deaths